Live in Louisville 1978 is a live album by Bootsy's Rubber Band. The album was originally released in the Netherlands in 1999 on the Disky Communications label. The CD features a live recording of Bootsy's Rubber Band performing at the Kentucky Exposition Center in Louisville, Kentucky on March 15, 1978, during the "Player Of The Year" tour. To date "Live in Louisville 1978" has never been released outside the Netherlands.

Tracks

Intro-Maceo – 0:23
Bootsy? (What's The Name Of This Town) – 3:15
Rubber Duckie – 0:56
Psychoticbumpschool – 3:17
Pinocchio Theory – 6:29
Hollywood Squares – 5:42
Roto-rooter – 3:27
Very Yes – 5:31
Can't Stay Away – 6:10
Stretchin' Out (In A Rubber Band) – 11:26
I'd Rather Be With You – 10:20
Aah The Name Is Bootsy, Baby – 4:27
Bootzilla – 6:22

Total album length is 68:05.

Personnel

Bootsy Collins – Space Bass, Lead vocals
Phelps Collins – Rhythm guitar
Frankie Kash Waddy – Drums
Joel Johnson – Keyboards
Maceo Parker, Richard Griffith, and Rick Gardner – Horns
Gary Cooper, Robert Johnson – Front ground vocals

References

External links
 

Bootsy Collins albums
1999 live albums